The men's singles luge competition at the 1988 Winter Olympics in Calgary was held on 14 and 15 February, at Canada Olympic Park.

Results

References

Luge at the 1988 Winter Olympics
Luge